The Isabella grape is a cultivar derived from the grape species Vitis labrusca or 'fox grape,' which is used for table, juice and wine production.

Appearance and use
The skin of Isabella when ripened is a dark purple, almost black with a tender green-yellow flesh.  It has large well formed fruit clusters with thick bloom. It is a slip skin variety, meaning that the skin separates easily from the fruit. The grapes are used to make wine, most notably Uhudler and Fragolino.  The Isabella, Vitis x labruscana, being of hybrid parentage, imparts a "foxiness" to the wine and because of this is thought to be objectionable, therefore it is not seen as a grape capable of making fine wines. For the table the flavour is good though with the astringent tough skin and "foxy" aroma is objectionable for some tastes.

History

Isabella, although popularly classified as being of Vitis labrusca parentage, is almost certainly a cross with an unknown Vitis vinifera, illustrated by the susceptibility to mildew and black rot.  It is thought that it resulted from random pollination when European Vitis vinifera grapes were attempted to be established in America. It was popularly thought to have been discovered by a Mrs Isabella Gibbs of South Carolina in 1816, however there is conflicting information with other sources stating it was found in Virginia, Delaware and Europe. Isabella vines were heavily imported into Europe in the early 19th century and it is said that it is probable that the phylloxera was introduced into Europe on the roots of Isabella — Isabella having a resistance to the phylloxera.

Modern history
In the western part of the European Union, Isabella is no longer a commercially important grape as it produces wines with a noticeable labrusca flavor, which is considered undesirable by many Western European connoisseurs. New plantings were banned in France after 1934. As a high yielding grape capable of withstanding tropical and semi-tropical conditions, it has been planted in Portugal, Bali, Japan, and various locations in the southern hemisphere such as in Colombia and Brazil, where it is a leading grape variety. In the U.S. it is sparsely grown in New York State. due to its phylloxera resistance and its cold hardiness. In Peru, where is locally known as "Borgoña", is widely popular as a table grape and as the source of sweet table wine.

One of the most popular grapes in the former USSR, Isabella was brought to former Soviet nations of Georgia, Azerbaijan and Moldova from France through Odessa. That's one of the reasons this variety is also called Odessa among Georgians. Russian poet Osip Mandelstam had described Isabella as "fleshy and heavy like a cluster of night itself". Radeda, a dry red Abkhazian wine, is made from Isabella.

Isabella is also found on the south shore of the Black Sea in Turkey. The Pontic Greeks from Trabzon have used it for wine production named "zamura". The berries are known to be used for the production of Pekmez and the leaves for preparing Sarma.

Aliases
Isabella has over 100 aliases including: Albany Surprise, Alexander, Black Cape, Borgoña, Champania, Constantia, Dorchester, Fragola, Framboisier, Glippertjie, Glipdruif, Isabelle, Izabella, Odessa, Raisin de Cassis, Moschostaphylo, Kerkyraios, Tudum and Tzortzidika., Căpșunică (Romania).

References

Red wine grape varieties
Table grape varieties

hr:Izabela(grožđe)
vec:Ua mericana